Darton is a village and surrounding area in the metropolitan borough of Barnsley, South Yorkshire, England, consisting of two wards, Darton East and Darton West.  The wards contain 48 listed buildings that are recorded in the National Heritage List for England.  Of these, one is listed at Grade I, the highest of the three grades, and the others are at Grade II, the lowest grade.  The wards contain the villages of Darton, Barugh and Kexbrough, the area of Wilthorpe, and the surrounding region.  The most important building in the list is All Saints Church, Darton, which is listed together with items in the churchyard, including many graveslabs.  Most of the other buildings are houses, cottages and associated structures, farmhouses and farm buildings.  The other listed buildings include a former Sunday school, a former Methodist church, a bridge, and a series of mileposts or milestones.


Key

Buildings

References

Citations

Sources

 

Lists of listed buildings in South Yorkshire
Buildings and structures in the Metropolitan Borough of Barnsley